8,9-Dehydroestradiol, or Δ8-17β-estradiol, also known as estra-1,3,5(10),8-tetraen-17β-ol-3-one, is a naturally occurring steroidal estrogen found in horses which is closely related to equilin, equilenin, and estradiol, and, as the 3-sulfate ester sodium salt, is a minor constituent of conjugated estrogens (Premarin). It is also an important active metabolite of 8,9-dehydroestrone, analogously to conversion of estrone or estrone sulfate into estradiol.

See also
 List of estrogens § Equine estrogens

References

Secondary alcohols
Estranes
Estrogens